Faris Saadoon Abed Al-Ageeli is an Iraqi Paralympic powerlifter. He represented Iraq at the 2004 Summer Paralympics held in Athens, Greece and he won the gold medal in the men's +100 kg event.

He won the bronze medal in the men's +107 kg event at the 2020 Summer Paralympics held in Tokyo, Japan.

References

External links 
 

Living people
Year of birth missing (living people)
Place of birth missing (living people)
Powerlifters at the 2004 Summer Paralympics
Powerlifters at the 2012 Summer Paralympics
Powerlifters at the 2020 Summer Paralympics
Medalists at the 2004 Summer Paralympics
Medalists at the 2012 Summer Paralympics
Medalists at the 2020 Summer Paralympics
Paralympic gold medalists for Iraq
Paralympic silver medalists for Iraq
Paralympic bronze medalists for Iraq
Paralympic medalists in powerlifting
Paralympic powerlifters of Iraq